Shadybrook is a census-designated place (CDP) in Cherokee County, Texas, United States. The population was 1,967 at the 2010 census.

It is located in the northwestern corner of the county adjacent to Lake Palestine, and takes its name from a gated community located on either side of Farm to Market Road 346. The CDP includes the namesake development along with other developments and individually owned houses in the area. A map of the CDP is shown here.

Geography

References

Unincorporated communities in Cherokee County, Texas
Census-designated places in Cherokee County, Texas
Unincorporated communities in Texas